Followers is an album by the American contemporary Christian music (CCM) band Tenth Avenue North. It was released by Provident Label Group, a division of Sony Music Entertainment, under its Reunion Records label, on October 14, 2016. The album reached No. 5 on the Billboard Christian Albums chart, and No. 151 on the Billboard 200. Three singles from the album were released: "What You Want" in 2016, and "I Have This Hope" and "Control (Somehow You Want Me)" in 2017, all of which appeared on the Billboard Hot Christian Songs chart.

Release and performance 

Followers was released on October 14, 2016, by Provident Label Group LLC, a division of Sony Music Entertainment. It first charted on both the US Billboard Christian Albums and Billboard 200 on the week of November 5, 2016, peaking that week on both charts at No. 5 and No. 151, respectively.

Three singles were released from the album. The first, "What You Want", was released five months in advance of the album on May 13, 2016, and charted on the Billboard Hot Christian Songs list, peaking at No. 17 on September 3, 2016. The other two were released in 2017 after the album, and reached the top 10 on Hot Christian Songs: "I Have This Hope" peaked at No. 5 on June 10, 2017, and "Control (Somehow You Want Me)" peaked at No. 7 on January 13, 2018.

Reception 

CCM Magazine gave the album 4 out of 5 stars, and cited its "killer vocal work on honest, relatable lyrics paired with ... strong songwriting."

Christian review website JesusFreakHideout rated the album 3.5 out of 5 stars. The review said the album was "pretty much what you would expect from a CCM release" and wrote that "What You Want" was "the most energetic song on the album". It singled out the opening track as "excellent" and the closing track as "powerful", and characterized the remaining songs as "eight solid but otherwise ordinary tracks."

Track listing
"Afraid" (3:48)
"What You Want" (3:37)
"Overflow" (3:40)
"I Have This Hope" (3:24)
"One Thing" (3:28)
"Sparrow (Under Heaven's Eyes)" (3:59)
"No One Can Steal Our Joy" (3:40)
"Control (Somehow You Want Me)" (4:08)
"Fighting for You" (3:22)
"I Confess" (5:15)

Chart performance

References

2016 albums
Tenth Avenue North albums